Nirvana Memorial Park (Chinese: 富貴山莊~~私營風景墓園) is a private cemetery and mortuary in Semenyih, Selangor, Malaysia. The longest dragon statue in Malaysia is located here. It is 1,000 feet long and serves as a columbarium. It is fully air conditioned inside. Nirvana was established in 1985 by David Kong and is touted as the largest funeral service in Southeast Asia. It also serves as a pet cemetery.

Notable burials
 Bai Guang – famous singer & one of the Seven Great Singing Stars
 Shuba Jaya – actress
 Teoh Beng Hock – political secretary

References

External links
 

Cemeteries in Selangor
Hulu Langat District
Tourist attractions in Selangor